Răzvan Costel Ionilă (born 10 January 1982) is a Romanian retired professional footballer. Although primarily a defender, Ionilă also played as a defensive midfielder.

Club career

Ionilă made his debut in the Romanian Divizia A while playing for Poli AEK Timișoara. After struggling with injuries, he gradually moved towards the lower leagues, making appearances for CF Brăila and Petrolul Ploiești, before calling an early end to his professional playing career at the age of 30.

Managerial career

In his late playing career, Ionilă fulfilled the role of player-manager for several lower league teams, before finally taking on the manager position in 2013 at Flacăra Făget. His focus then moved to coaching juniors football, joining Galaxy Timișoara, the academy of his former teammate, Silviu Bălace. Alongside Bălace, he became assistant manager at Poli Timișoara in 2019.

References

External links
 

1982 births
Living people
Sportspeople from Craiova
Romanian footballers
Association football defenders
Liga I players
Liga II players
FC Politehnica Timișoara players
Romanian football managers
AFC Dacia Unirea Brăila players
FC Petrolul Ploiești players